Movement Disorders is a peer-reviewed medical journal, first published in 1986. The journal focuses on original research relating to neurological movement disorders. The editor-in-chief is A. Jon Stoessl (University of British Columbia).

Abstracting and indexing 
The journal is abstracted and indexed in: Current Advances in Neuroscience, Current Awareness in Biological Sciences, Current Contents/Clinical Medicine, Current Contents/Life Sciences, EMBASE/Excerpta Medica, Index Medicus/MEDLINE/PubMed, Journal Citation Reports/Science Edition, Science Citation Index, and Scopus.

According to the Journal Citation Reports, the journal has a 2021 impact factor of 9.698, ranking it 16th out of 212 journals in the category "Clinical Neurology".

References

External links

The International Parkinson and Movement Disorder Society

Neurology journals
Publications established in 1986
Wiley-Liss academic journals
English-language journals
Journals published between 13 and 25 times per year